In enzymology, a nucleoside phosphotransferase is an enzyme that catalyzes the chemical reaction

a nucleotide + a 2'-deoxynucleoside  a nucleoside + a 2'-deoxynucleoside 5'-phosphate

Thus, the two substrates of this enzyme are nucleotide and 2'-deoxynucleoside, whereas its two products are nucleoside and 2'-deoxynucleoside 5'-phosphate.

This enzyme belongs to the family of transferases, specifically those transferring phosphorus-containing groups (phosphotransferases) with an alcohol group as acceptor.  The systematic name of this enzyme class is nucleotide:nucleoside 5'-phosphotransferase. Other names in common use include nonspecific nucleoside phosphotransferase, and nucleotide:3'-deoxynucleoside 5'-phosphotransferase.

References

 
 

EC 2.7.1
Enzymes of unknown structure